Marc Glimcher (born September 16, 1963) is an American art dealer who is the President and CEO of Pace Gallery, a modern and contemporary art gallery founded by his father, Arne Glimcher, in Boston in 1960. He and his father were cited among the top 100 most powerful people in the international art world, according to the annual "Power 100" list published by ArtReview. In 2012, Glimcher sold a Gerhard Richter painting for more than $20 million at Art Basel in Basel, Switzerland.

Education 
Glimcher was born in New York City. He is the second son (his brother is neuroscientist Paul W. Glimcher) of Mildred “Milly” and Arnold “Arne” Glimcher, an art historian and art dealer respectively, who together founded Pace Gallery in Boston in 1960. He graduated from Harvard University in 1985 with a degree in biological anthropology, and from 1989 to 1991 studied biochemistry and immunology at Johns Hopkins University.

Art world career 
Glimcher joined Pace Gallery in 1985 as Associate Director, and was named President and CEO in 2011. In his more than 30 years with the gallery, Glimcher has bolstered Pace's roster of artists to include established artists such as Michal Rovner, Julian Schnabel, and as well as rising artists such as Loie Hollowell. Glimcher has also broadened Pace's representation of artist estates, including the Robert Rauschenberg Foundation and Vito Acconci Studio.

Glimcher oversees the gallery's global activities from its headquarters in New York City, including international expansion to Beijing, London, Palo Alto, Seoul, Geneva, and, most recently, Hong Kong. In 2008, Glimcher founded Artifex Press, the first digital, online catalogue raisonné publishing company.

He has also curated a number of thematic exhibitions including Jean Dubuffet: A Retrospective; Je Suis le Cahier, The Sketchbooks of Picasso (1986), the only comprehensive exhibition of Picasso’s sketchbooks; Mark Rothko: The Last Paintings; Earthly Forms: The Biomorphic Sculpture of Arp, Calder, and Noguchi; Alexander Calder: From Model to Monument; and Logical Conclusions: 40 Years of Rule-Based Art, for which he authored the catalogue essay (2005).

Personal life
Glimcher is married to Fairfax Dorn, the co-founder and artistic director of Ballroom Marfa. The couple resides in New York City. Glimcher has a single son, Matthew, who currently attends Purdue University as a freshman undergraduate student.

References

External links 
 Pace Gallery

1963 births
Living people
American art dealers
Harvard College alumni
Johns Hopkins University alumni
American chief executives